Live conferencing refers to the live streaming of interactive audio and video presentations, lectures, meetings, and seminars to the global audience with the help of a camera and conferencing equipment. Such equipment lets businesses connect and coordinate with remote workforces located in different region, engage them in productive real-time discussions, and record individual or group responses.

Live conferencing enables presenters to transmit and share information beyond geographical boundaries with anytime, anywhere access. The prominent live conferencing solution or equipment manufacturers include: Panasonic, Sony, Polycom, Avermedia, Accordent, MediaPointe, ClearOne, LifeSize, Tandberg, Kedacom, etc. The live conferencing services allow presentations, events, lectures, and meetings to be recorded and shared at the same time to a geographically dispersed audience – on or off office or corporate work facility.
 
The Live Conferencing  leverages instant sharing of information from one place to another with just an internet connection and personal computers such as desktops, laptops, and tablet computers using the popular TCP/IP connection. The cutting-edge design and interface of the equipment combined with cloud technologies, enables both individual and group participation in the session. Individual or a group of individuals can interact using a single PC with the remote presenter(S) to share information, brainstorm ideas, and analyze data.

Applications

Education
 Simultaneous lectures in and off the classroom. Instructors can web cast and deliver live lectures to the students sitting inside and outside the classroom – enabling complete interaction with Q/A features, live chat, and real-time quizzes.
 Expert lectures. Live conferencing lets K-12 and universities to invite the interest of regional and international experts on a subject and let them communicate and instruct audience from their preferred or existing locations.
 Lecture retention. Live conferencing can be used to retain classroom lectures through instant recording. The recorded lectures can be distributed to the audience with or without editing in an instant to eliminate manual note taking and encourage students to focus on the lectures during the class.

Corporate 
 Interactive executive meetings—Live conferencing serves as a smart tool for conducting interactive live meetings between corporate executives, regional managers, and different district or state offices and staff.
 Seminars around the globe—It helps corporate and businesses to hold virtual seminars, called Webinars, and invite public or private audience to watch live speaker sessions, participate through feedback forms, and collaborate on phone.
 Web conferencing and screen sharing—Interactive live conferencing is also used to stimulate user interest with online video collaboration and desktop sharing or screen cast. The screen cast feature lets the presenter to share his/her desktop screen with the audience and process information through different simulations, web content, and PowerPoint presentations.

Healthcare 
 Remote patient monitoring—In healthcare units, live conferencing equipment is used to monitor in-patients from remote locations. It is installed in rooms to monitor the health status of a patient, who has chronicle diseases, to save physicians time.
 Healthcare trainings—Live conferencing is an effective method of delivering Interactive Live lectures and Trainings to the remote practitioners, physicians, and staff for continued productivity and improved performance.

Features of equipment 
Enhancing existing communication infrastructure and corporate collaboration, Live conferencing forwards following typical features:

 End to end web-based communication with VoIP and audio and video conferencing incorporated.
 Real time live conferencing of audio and video sessions.
 Instantaneous recordings of presenter audio and video and multimedia content such as animations, web pages, screen casts, annotations, highlights, still images, documents, graphs, etc.
 Live chat between the presenter and the audience. Plus, dedicated chat rooms for visitors.
 Pre-conference or lecture registration to approve and disapprove or limit audience.
 Embedding features to let presenters incorporate live conferencing as Google+ hangouts or Facebook conferences.
 Real time quizzes, feedbacks, polls, and survey forms to evaluate students, know the comprehension level of the audience, and gather participant feedback.
 Integration with interactive whiteboards, LCD panels, multimedia projectors, document cameras, tablet computers, audience response system, and other presentation or smart room equipment.
 Ultimate screen sharing to the live audience.
 On-screen editing of content, Web graphics, program codes, and simulations.
 Intuitive calendar applications to plan and schedule live events and avoid conflicts.

Hardware versus software 
, live conferencing is becoming ubiquitous. It is influencing users with the influx of knowledge, communication edge provided. Live conferencing equipment includes hardware and software aspects to bring complete solutions. However, some software based live conferencing solutions require no hardware infrastructure except a camera and computer to stream, record, and evaluate the audience.

These software applications work independently of dedicated hardware and make installation and operations faster and easier with user-friendly Web based or local area network. Both hardware and software based solutions bring the most common features of live conferencing as stated above.

Benefits of using equipment 
Live conferencing equipment with cutting-edge technologies and comprehensive features provide several benefits:

 Cost saving—Most live conferencing equipment and solutions integrate with existing hardware or corporate infrastructure to save cost. Further, live conferencing saves traveling and lodging cost spent in attending in-person seminars or meeting.
 Reduced communication time—Live conferencing enables instant communication with just few clicks. It requires no traveling and can be connected any time beyond geographical boundaries. Live conferencing saves communication time through organization wide network of networking points.
 Increased efficiencies—Live conferencing improves student performance, comprehension, and employee satisfaction with immediate communication and leverages managers and instructors to address problems right away.
 Ease of Use—Live conferencing equipment is usually easy-to-use built with familiar interfaces and standard technologies.

See also 
 Videoconferencing

References 
Citations

Teleconferencing
Groupware
Assistive technology
Videotelephony
Video